Dictyophorus griseus is a species of African grasshopper in the family Pyrgomorphidae, the gaudy grasshoppers.

Two subspecies are accepted:
Dictyophorus griseus griseus (Reiche & Fairmaire, 1849)
Dictyophorus griseus oberthueri (Bolívar, 1894)

References

Pyrgomorphidae
Orthoptera of Africa
Insects described in 1849